Locked In is the sixth studio album by the rock band Wishbone Ash, and their second with guitarist Laurie Wisefield who had joined the band in 1974. The album peaked at No. 36 in the UK Albums Chart in April 1976, their lowest UK chart placing to date. Considered by many, including the band themselves, to be one of the weaker entries in their extensive catalog. The band frequently place the blame on producer Tom Dowd, who insisted the band play much quieter in the studio, removing much of the energy of their performances. The band had switched U.S. distribution from MCA Records to Atlantic Records for this and the next release, New England.

Track listing
All songs composed by Wishbone Ash, except where noted
"Rest in Peace" – 6:44
"No Water in the Well" (Laurie Wisefield) – 3:47
"Moonshine" – 3:35
"She Was My Best Friend" (Martin Turner) – 3:52
"It Started in Heaven" (Wisefield, Steve Upton) – 3:22
"Half Past Lovin'" – 5:32
"Trust in You" – 5:06
"Say Goodbye" (Turner, Wisefield) – 5:00

Personnel
Wishbone Ash
Martin Turner – bass, vocals
Andy Powell – guitars, vocals
Laurie Wisefield – guitars, vocals
Steve Upton – drums
with:
Pete Wood - keyboards
Cissy Houston, Sylvia Shemwell and Eunice Peterson - backing vocals on tracks 4 and 5

Production
Producer: Tom Dowd
Recordists: Geoff Daking and Jay Borden
Mixdown: Geoff Daking, Jay Borden and Bobby Warner
Album art direction: Alan Sussman and Bob Defrin
Album cover illustration: Chris Corey
Album backliner photography: David Gahr

Charts

References

1976 albums
Wishbone Ash albums
Albums produced by Tom Dowd
MCA Records albums